The South Australian National Football League, or SANFL ( or S-A-N-F-L), is an Australian rules football league based in the Australian state of South Australia. It is also the state's governing body for the sport.

Originally formed as the South Australian Football Association on 30 April 1877, the SANFL is the oldest surviving football league of any code in Australia and is the 7th oldest club football league in the world.

Consisting of a single division competition, since the admission of the Adelaide Crows AFL Reserves in 2014 the season, has been a 10-team, 18-round home-and-away (regular) season from April to September. The top five teams play-off in a final series culminating in the grand final for the Thomas Seymour Hill Premiership Trophy. The grand final had traditionally been held at Football Park in October, generally the week after the AFL Grand Final, though this was altered ahead of the 2014 season resulting in Adelaide Oval hosting the grand final in the penultimate weekend of September.

The league owned the sub-licences for South Australia's two AFL club—Adelaide Football Club and Port Adelaide Football Club—until March 2014, when South Australian Football Commission reached an agreement with the Adelaide and Port Adelaide football clubs—endorsed by the AFL—which will see the two AFL licences transferred to the clubs in return for payments totalling more than $18 million.

The league is also responsible for the management of all levels of football in the state. This includes junior football, country football, amateur football and specific programs rolled out across schools, indigenous communities (including the APY Lands in the state's north) and newly arrived migrant communities.

The SANFL owned Football Park, formerly the largest stadium in South Australia. The stadium, which opened in 1974, was primarily used for Australian Football League matches up until 2013 and had a capacity of over 51,000 prior to being demolished. The stadium was the headquarters for the league from 1974 to 2013. The SANFL competition is the second highest attended Australian rules football league behind the AFL.

History

Before 1877 

The first recorded game of any "football" in South Australia was that of 'Caid' played in Thebarton by people of the local Irish community in 1843 to celebrate St Patrick's Day. In 1844 there was debate amongst the South Australian Legislative Council whether it be allowed that "foot-ball" be played on Sundays, with arguments against preferring the quiet worship of God. In 1859 the Gawler Institute ran a rural fete which included a game of football being staged.

The earliest recorded Australian rules football club in South Australia was Adelaide Football Club (unrelated to the modern day Adelaide Crows), formed in 1860. The early years of football were poorly organised and dogged by argument over which set of rules to adopt. A meeting of three delegates from each of the three clubs—Adelaide, Kensington and Port Adelaide—held a meeting on 10 March 1873, with Charles Kingston from Adelaide voted as Chair in an attempted to draw up a standard code of playing rules.

However, after a match between Port Adelaide and Kensington in July 1873, it was remarked that neither side understood the rules clearly. As the years progressed, there became a growing push for uniformity and structure in South Australian football.

1877–1896: SAFA establishment and the early years
In 1877, following an initial meeting called by Richard Twopeny on Thursday 19 April 1877 at Prince Alfred Hotel  delegates from 13 of South Australia's football clubs met to develop a uniform set of rules and establish a governing body. The South Australian Football Association was formed at a meeting called at the Prince Alfred Hotel in King William Street, Adelaide on 30 April 1877, the first governing body of its type for football in Australia, and adopted rules similar to those used in Victoria upon the urging of Charles Cameron Kingston. The use of an oval ball, bouncing the ball and pushing from behind forbidden amongst the rules agreed.

The clubs that sent 2 delegates each to the meeting were: South Park, Willunga, Port Adelaide, Adelaide, North Adelaide, Prince Alfred College, Gawler, Kapunda, Bankers, Woodville, South Adelaide, Kensington, and Victorian.

The inaugural 1877 SAFA season was contested by 8 clubs. A number of games were played by Adelaide and Woodville against Gawler and Kapunda but these weren't counted in the premiership table at the end of the season. South Adelaide and Victorian were declared joint Club Champions.

In 1878, a brand new club Norwood was formed following the entire collapse of Woodville by a number of former players and it joined the Association for the season.

An end of season match on 31 August between a combined Adelaide Team from the Association against a combined team from the 3 country clubs – Gawler, Kapunda and Willunga was played on the Adelaide Ground. With the Adelaide team winning 5 goals to 1.

Of the original clubs – Bankers (1877), Woodville (1877), Kensington (1881 after merging with Adelaide), South Park (1884), Victorian (1884) had all left the competition by 1884.

Three new Clubs were admitted in 1887 – Hotham, Gawler Albion and West Adelaide but all only lasted for a few seasons. West Adelaide folded after just one season in 1887, Hotham which renamed to North Adelaide for 1888 merged with Adelaide for the 1889 season, and Gawler after its 4th season notified the Association in writing in April 1891 that it would no longer be joining (principally due to being given only 5 home games at Gawler and 10 away games in Adelaide for the 1890 season).

In 1888 Medindie Football Club (nickname Dingoes) joined the SAFA. On 14 March 1893, at a meeting held at Temperance Hall, North Adelaide it renamed to North Adelaide Football Club.

By 1894, Season with the demise of the Adelaide (which rejoined for the 1885 Season and became Premiers for the 1886 SAFA season) at the end of the 1893 Season, the Association had been reduced to just four clubs Port Adelaide, South Adelaide, Norwood and North Adelaide (originally called Medindie).

In 1895, a newly formed 5th senior club called Natives was admitted which was formed from players from various districts and a group of periphery Port Adelaide players who wanted more playing time.

In 1896, North Adelaide and the Natives were permitted to field 23 players (3 extra players).

1897–1900: Introduction of Electorate District Zoning and other Changes 

1897 saw a number of changes, District football was introduced optionally in 1897 with the aim of zoning players to a SAFA club (and became compulsory in 1899).

On 5 April 1897, The Association approved the application of the current West Adelaide Football Club to join the SAFA from the Suburban Association  and The Native Football Club (1895–1896) altered its name to West Torrens Football Club, which meant the Association comprised six clubs until the turn of the century.

The 1897 SAFA season was the first season of football in South Australia where behinds contributed to the total score, not just goals.

The 3 newer clubs continued to struggle against the older 3 clubs. In the 1st Round both West Adelaide (vs Norwood) and West Torrens (vs Port Adelaide) failed to score for the whole game. There was also a number of walkovers throughout the season when the newer clubs failed to field a team.

In 1898, the Magarey Medal was awarded to the fairest and most brilliant player for the first time.

In 1899, after a period of declining public interest in football due to the long term inequality between the 3 traditional clubs (Port Adelaide, South Adelaide and Norwood) and the 3 younger clubs (West Adelaide, West Torrens and North Adelaide), the SAFA introduced electorate football, meaning that players were allocated to clubs based on the district in which they resided. and the playing teams were reduced from 20 to 18.

At a meeting held on Monday 8 May 1899 with a large number of delegates present the Secretary was instructed to write to the Gawler and Port Pirie Associations to inform them that their applications to join the SAFA would not be entertained this year as purely electorate football was being tried.

In mid- to late 1900 there was growing interest to form a senior club in the Sturt Electoral District based around Unley to join the SAFA.

In 1900, North Adelaide won the Grand Final against South Adelaide breaking the dominance of the 3 old traditional Clubs – Norwood (11), South Adelaide (8) and Port Adelaide (3) which together had won 22 of the first 23 premierships (1877–1899).

1901–1913: Pre war years 
The competition expanded to 7 teams when a new club Sturt joined the Association in 1901, but it performed poorly initially, finishing last in its first four seasons. In 1902, Port Adelaide adopted its now famous black and white colours. In 1907, the Association changed its name to the South Australian Football League. Norwood and Port Adelaide continued their domination of the league, and were joined by West Adelaide and North Adelaide; between them, the four clubs won all premierships between 1901 and 1913. West Adelaide followed three straight wooden spoons from 1904 to 1906 with four out of the five premierships from 1908 to 1912 (including Championship of Australia in 1908 and 1913), the most successful period in West Adelaide's history. In 1910 Adelaide University made an application to enter the competition. This led to players such as Jack Londrigan leaving league clubs such as Sturt in anticipation for a University league team. However the application was ultimately rejected by the competition out of fear a University side would compromise the electorate system, also referred to as zones, introduced to equalise the state competition.

1914–1918: World War I years 
The SAFL maintained competition for the first two years of World War I, 1914 and 1915, with Sturt winning their first premiership in 1915, but from 1916 the competition was suspended and did not resume until 1919. However, a league competition was formed in 1916 called South Australian Patriotic Football League by the SAFL Clubs and a number of non-AFL Clubs. The league existed for 3 seasons (1916, 1917 and 1918) and Games held were used to raise funds for the war effort. The SAFL was opposed to the formation of the Patriotic League and refused to recognise it during and after World War I.

1919–1941: Inter war years 
Sturt won the first premiership of the post-World War I era, beating North Adelaide in the Challenge Final replay after a Draw occurred in the 1919 SAFL Grand Final. Glenelg was admitted to the B Grade for 1920 and became 8th club in the senior league in 1921 but started poorly with five consecutive wooden spoons. In 1927, the South Australian Football League was renamed the South Australian National Football League. Everyone of the 8 clubs won at least one premiership during the 9 years from 1927 to 1935, including Glenelg which their first premiership in 1934 would be the only success in their first 52 years. Prior to World War 2 Port Adelaide won three premierships in the period 1934–1939, appearing in 6 successive grand finals.

1942–1945: World War II war years 
The SANFL continued normal competition for the first few years of World War II, but from 1942 to 1944 for 3 seasons the clubs merged on a geographical basis. 
The competing teams were:
Port-Torrens (Port Adelaide and West Torrens), wearing Port Adelaide colours and known as the Magpies
Norwood-North (Norwood and North Adelaide), wearing North Adelaide colours and known as the Redlegs
Sturt-South (Sturt and South Adelaide), wearing Sturt colours and known as the Blues
West-Glenelg (West Adelaide and Glenelg), wearing Glenelg colours and known as the Tigers

1946–1969: Post World War 2 Port Adelaide and Sturt rivalry 
In 1954, the tradition of painting the chimney of the West End brewery in Hindley Street, then owned by the South Australian Brewing Company, with the team colours of the SANFL premier and runner-up began, when a West Adelaide player and employee Clarrie Cannon suggested painting the chimney in the West Adelaide colours, red and black, as the brewery was located in their territory. General manager C. R. Aitken agreed, but only if West Adelaide was the winning team that year. However Port Adelaide coach and captain, Fos Williams, said that he expected his team to win, and the men agreed that if Port Adelaide won, their colours would be painted on the chimney. Port Adelaide won that year, so the chimney was painted in black and white vertical stripes, but Williams suggested that a red stripe be painted below the black to honour the runners-up.

Straight after the War Sturt won their Second Premiership. The next three years were dominated by Norwood. Port Adelaide, led by Fos Williams, dominated the 1950s winning seven premierships, including a record setting six Grand Final wins in a row from 1954 to 1959. This record also matched Norwood's six in a row in 1883, set before the advent of regular Grand Finals.

Port Adelaide continued their dominance of the competition in the early 1960s with three more premierships by 1965.

A resurgent Sturt under coach Jack Oatey won five straight premierships from 1966 to 1970, sharing a fierce rivalry with Port Adelaide whom they met in four consecutive Grand Finals (1965–1968).

1959–1964: Expansion to 10 Teams 

From the early 1950s there was some discussion about expanding the competition and in particular a team from the outer northern Adelaide area joining the SANFL. Previously a team from Gawler had competed for 4 seasons from 1887 to 1890. On 20 March 1950 Salisbury Football Club made an application to join the SANFL. Applications by Burnside and Woodville were also rejected by the SANFL in June 1950.

In February 1953, The Mayor of Woodville again raised the issue of having a team admitted. Citing a large number of players from West Torrens and Port Adelaide actually resided in the City of Woodville.

In 1959 the SANFL finally admitted two new clubs Central District and Woodville. The new Clubs would play 5 years in the Reserves before joining the A Grade in 1964. Both clubs performed poorly, and many questioned the purpose of introducing two more teams, in particular Woodville, who were closely surrounded by existing clubs, Port Adelaide and West Torrens.

1970–1979: Golden Era 

Sturt began the 1970s by defeating Glenelg in a rain-affected Grand Final by 21 points. North Adelaide secured back-to-back premiership victories over Port Adelaide in 1971 and 1972 and defeated VFL premier Carlton by one point in the end-of-season Championship of Australia match. Glenelg won their 2nd premiership, and first since 1934, defeating North Adelaide by 7 points in 1973 in the highest scoring	Grand Final 21.11 (137) to 19.16 (130). Port Adelaide continued their success, winning two premierships themselves (1977, 1979), and finishing lower than 3rd only once for the decade. Other premiership winning clubs in the 1970s were Sturt (1970, 1974, 1976), Glenelg (1973), and Norwood (1975, 1978). On 4 May 1974, Central District and North Adelaide played the first game at newly opened Football Park at West Lakes. SANFL moved its administration to the new stadium, and 58,042 attended the first Grand Final at the ground later that year, with Sturt defeating Glenelg by 15 points despite kicking into a stiff breeze in the last quarter after leading by 5 points at three-quarter time. The 1975 season was highlighted by Glenelg's score of 49.23 (317) against Central District, with a winning margin of 238 points which was larger, at that time, than the previous highest score ever recorded by a side in a single game. In 1976, Sturt defeated Grand Final favourites Port Adelaide by 41 points in front of a record ticketed Football Park crowd of 66,897. Norwood won the 1978 premiership in their centenary year by beating Sturt in the Grand Final by one point after Sturt had lost just one game for the entire season. During the 1970s, an increasing number of SANFL players moved to Victoria to play in the VFL competition.

1980–1989: VFL leaves ANFC and expands whilst SANFL struggles  
Four clubs Port Adelaide (Premiers 1980,1981,1988,1989 RU 1984), Norwood (Premiers 1982,1984 RU 1980), North Adelaide (Premiers 1987, RU 1985, 1986 & 1989) and Glenelg (Premiers 1985,1986 RU 1981,1982,1987,1988) dominated the SANFL in the 1980s, accounting for nine premierships. The only year being the exception was 1983 when West Adelaide defeated Sturt in the Grand Final for their first premiership since 1961. In the decade between 1979 to 1989 only three clubs, Central District, Woodville, both admitted to the SANFL in 1964, and West Torrens were the only clubs not to reach at least one grand final. The exodus of high quality players to the VFL accelerated in the 1980s. In this same decade only Hawthorn (1979, 1984, 1988 & 1989), Carlton (1980, 1982, 1983, & 1987), Richmond (1981), and Essendon 1985, & 1986) were successful in the VFL. Only Collingwood (1979, & 1980), Melbourne (1988) and Geelong under first year expat coach and former Woodville player Malcolm Blight (1989) would reach a VFL grand final. In 1981 the VFL rejected a SANFL bid to enter a composite South Australian team to its competition. The SANFL introduced a player retention scheme in 1988 in an attempt to maintain the quality of the competition in the face of falling attendances. Night football was introduced in 1984 after floodlights were installed at Football Park.

The tradition of painting the colours of the premier and runners-up was maintained at the Hindley Street premises of SA Brewing until its closure in 1980, before transferring to the Thebarton site, which was rebadged "West End".

1990–1999: Adelaide and Port Adelaide AFL entry 

On 31 July 1990, Port Adelaide surprised the SANFL by making an independent bid to join the AFL. The SANFL was left with little option but to submit its own bid to enter the AFL. In a thirty-minute meeting the SANFL formed the Adelaide Football Club. While Port Adelaide had by far the largest supporter base in South Australia, it could not compete with the SANFL's offer of a composite club, dismantling of the SANFL player retention scheme, dropping of court action against Port Adelaide and the use of Football Park, and in November 1990, following a legal battle (dropped), the AFL announced the Adelaide Football Club had been granted a license and would enter the competition in 1991.

The Adelaide Crows debuted in 1991 wearing the state colours of navy blue, red and yellow. While the Adelaide Crows enjoyed crowds of over 40,000 every week and dominated local media coverage, crowds at local SANFL matches suffered substantially.

In 1994 after a tender process put to all the SANFL clubs, the Port Adelaide Football Club secured a licence to enter the AFL. Port Adelaide chose the nickname of 'Power' since 'Magpies' was already used by Collingwood. Port Adelaide wished to maintain its presence (as the Magpies) in the SANFL, which was agreed to on the basis that Port Adelaide's SANFL and AFL entities operate independently. The club in the SANFL was renamed "Port Adelaide Magpies Football Club" to reflect this separation.

Port Adelaide dominated the SANFL in this time, contesting 10 Grand Finals in 12 years between 1988 and 1999 – winning 9 premierships 1988–1990,1992,1994–1996,1998–1999) and losing just the one Grand Final in 1997 to Norwood (their 27th Flag). This Port Adelaide dominance in the period is somewhat of an aberration. It should be kept in context with the hasty formation of the Adelaide Crows in 1991. (ref: https://view.officeapps.live.com/op/view.aspx?src=http%3A%2F%2Fwww.sahistorians.org.au%2F175%2Fbm.doc%2Fendangered-species-2a.doc&wdOrigin=BROWSELINK) During this period many of the remaining SANFL clubs' best players were seconded to the Adelaide Crows, whereas the Port Adelaide list was largely left intact due to the conflict that ensued around the Port Adelaide rank-breaking bid to join the expanded VFL competition as a stand alone club. The Woodville and West Torrens Clubs merged at the end of the 1990 Season and won their first premiership in 1993 against Norwood. Between 1900 and 1999 Port Adelaide contested a total of 59 Grand Finals – winning the Flag 33 times to bring their total to 36.

2000–2010: Central District domination 

There was a changing of the guard as the new century started. For more than 100 years one of Port Adelaide, Norwood, North Adelaide or Sturt appeared in every Grand Final. The year 2000 saw the two newest teams Central District and Woodville-West Torrens played off in the Grand Final. Central District appeared in 12 Consecutive Grand Finals from 2000 to 2011, collecting nine premierships (2000–2001, 2003–2005, 2007–2010). Only Sturt (2002) and Woodville-West Torrens (2006 & 2011) interrupted Centrals' run during this period. Centrals played in 28 Finals games between 2000 and 2011 for a total of 25 wins (which included 12 consecutive 2nd Semi Final wins) and just 3 losses (2002,2006,2011 Grand Finals).

Under-age divisions were restructured, with under 17 and under 19 competitions dissolved in favour of under 16 and under 18 leagues, the latter coming into line with Victoria's TAC Cup competition and under the sponsorship of McDonald's would be known as the Macca's Cup. The former would become the Macca's Shield, the season length is around half that of the other levels of competition. Night games would become a feature at Elizabeth Oval, with Central District hosting Saturday night matches from 2006.

2011–2019: Independence for AFL clubs; league returns to Adelaide Oval 
Central District finished minors again in the 2011 SANFL season and defeated Norwood in the Second Semi-Final for their 12th Consecutive Grand Final appearance but suffered a narrow 3 point loss to Woodville-West Torrens, despite after outscoring the Eagles 4–4 to 1–1 in the last quarter, which brought an end to their dominance in the Grand Finals. The 2012 SANFL season saw Centrals exit the finals for the first time since 2000 without contesting in the Grand Final, this time after finishing 2nd at the end of the minor round with defeats by West Adelaide in the Qualifying and then North Adelaide in the 1st Semi-Final.

The 2012 and 2013 premierships were both won by Norwood, firstly defeating West Adelaide by 49 points to win their 28th flag and then subsequently defeating North Adelaide by 40 points for their 29th flag. This was the first time Norwood had won back to back flags for 90 years when coincidentally they also beat West Adelaide (1922) and North Adelaide (1923).

With Norwood and Elizabeth's night match experiment largely successful and popular, West Adelaide (2010), South Adelaide (2011) and Glenelg (2012) would follow suit by installing their own lighting systems at their respective grounds while Woodville-West Torrens had hoped to play under lights at Thebarton Oval, which to date have only done so once in 2012 during their premiership defence.

In 2011, AFL-based Port Adelaide and SANFL-based Port Adelaide Magpies merged to address losses at both clubs, however, in 2013 the club announced that the Magpies would officially become the reserves team for Port's AFL players, joining the Adelaide Football Club in fielding a reserves team in the SANFL in time for the 2014 season. These moves caused some furore in some fan circles. The 2013 Grand Final was the last SANFL match at AAMI Stadium, with SANFL league headquarters to remain at AAMI but the finals to return to the new and improved Adelaide Oval from 2014. Ahead of the 2014 season, the AFL-based Adelaide Football Club were granted a licence to field a reserve team in the competition, increasing the number of teams in the league to 10.

As a result of the Magpies becoming the Power's reserve team, and the inclusion of the Crows reserves team in the SANFL in 2014, the other SANFL clubs will lose their AFL contracted players as those contracted to the Crows or Power will move to play exclusively for those clubs in either league. Norwood defeated arch-rivals Port Adelaide Magpies by 4 points in the 2014 Grand Final to secure their 30th Flag and 3rd in a row (2012–2014) for the first time since 1887–89.

Norwood's dominance of the competition would end in the 2015 season, eliminated at the first week of the finals as West Adelaide ended a 32-year premiership drought with their five-goal defeat of Woodville-West Torrens in the Grand Final.

The 2016 and 2017 premierships were both won by Sturt their 14th and 15th Flags and first since 2002.

The 2018 premiership was won by North their 14th Flag and first since 1991. North Adelaide were fined $10,000 and docked four premiership points for next season but allowed to play in the Grand Final against Norwood after a controversial 5 point win in the Preliminary Final against Woodville-West Torrens when they had 19 players on the field during the early stages of the fourth quarter.

The 2019 premiership was won by Glenelg their 5th Flag and first since 1986 ending a 33-year premiership drought. This meant within the last 10 seasons 7 different clubs had won a premiership. Only the two original clubs of the competition South Adelaide (last flag in 1964) and Port Adelaide (last flag in 1999) had not won a premiership flag in at least the last 20 years (excluding the Adelaide Crows reserves team).

2020–present 
The 2020 season was originally scheduled to run from April until September; however its commencement was delayed to June 2020 due to the COVID-19 pandemic. The number of clubs participating in the season was reduced to eight, as Adelaide Crows and Port Adelaide Magpies AFL Reserves were barred from fielding their reserves teams by the Australian Football League. This is the first time in its history that Port Adelaide hadn't competed in the SANFL. The season was conducted with 14 rounds and a Final Four. Woodville-West Torrens defeated North Adelaide in the Grand Final. This was the last time that the top two teams' colours were painted on the West End brewery's chimney, before that site's closure.

The Woodville West Torrens Eagles were the 2021 SANFL Premiers, after they defeated Glenelg. The tradition of painting a chimney in the two teams' colours continues at the Hoffmann Kiln at the Brickworks Marketplace in nearby Torrensville from 2021, with the cost of the painting continuing to be borne by Lion. but the colours had to be temporarily placed on a replica chimney, as due to high winds it was deemed to unsafe to climb the chimney on the day of the ceremony.

SANFL Clubs

(R = Reserves for AFL Seniors)

Venues
Games are generally hosted at suburban grounds throughout Adelaide.

Former venues
 Gawler Oval (1887–1890)
Glanville Hall Estate (1870–1879)
Kensington Oval (1875–1897)
Jubilee Oval (1898–1906)
Hindmarsh Oval (1905–1921)
Thebarton Oval (1922–2012)
Wayville Showground (1927–1939)
Football Park (1974–2013)
Bice Oval (1992–1993)

League administration 
The league's revenue is derived from its paid attendance, media and payments from both the Adelaide Crows and Port Adelaide AFL clubs for use of Adelaide Oval.

The SANFL is classed as a semi-professional competition. In 2008 the league had a salary cap of $400,000 (excluding service payments). This is the second highest in Australia for an Australian rules football competition, after the AFL.

The Chief Executive Officer (CEO) of the SANFL is Darren Chandler, who replaced Jake Parkinson in the role in 2020.

SANFL Ladder
South Australian leagues (including the SANFL) award two points for a win, and one for a draw. Elsewhere in Australia generally four points are awarded for a win and two for a draw. In addition, percentage is calculated as "For" ÷ "For and Against" × "100". Elsewhere in Australia it is generally calculated as "For" ÷ "Against" × "100".

Audience 
The SANFL match-day program is called the Football Budget and is sold at all SANFL matches. A special edition is produced for the grand final.

The SANFL competition's "match of the round" was broadcast weekly in South Australia on ABC Southern (ABC1 South Australia). Until early 2008, it was also broadcast nationally on ABC2 television. In 2012, nationwide SANFL match replays resumed on ABC2. Match replays are also available nationally on ABC iView. In 2007, the SANFL measured a record 1,415,000 total television viewers.

The SANFL competition is covered by local radio stations Life FM (live) and 5RPH (live). ABC Local Radio and 5AA broadcast the SANFL Finals Series.

In 2013, the SANFL signed a three-year deal with the Seven Network to broadcast weekly matches on 7mate from the start of the 2014 season. Popular Mix102.3 radio host and Seven News Adelaide sports presenter Mark Soderstrom, former Port Adelaide Magpies captain and 5AA breakfast show personality Tim Ginevar, and former Fox Sports commentator John Casey (who spent time with Seven Adelaide during the 1980s and 1990s) will be the chief callers for the 2014 SANFL season. This marks the leagues return to commercial television for the first time since Channel 9 broadcast the SANFL in 1992.

Attendance
Although SANFL crowds now competes heavily with the two AFL national league clubs, the SANFL still has the second highest attendance of any Australian rules football league and the highest attendance for any regional league of any football code. It continues to publish attendance figures.

The record attendance for an SANFL fixture was set at the 1976 SANFL Grand Final between Sturt and Port Adelaide at Football Park which saw 66,987 crammed into the stadium, though some estimate the crowd to have been as high as 80,000 with thousands turned away at the gates. The largest attendance for a minor round fixture was set in Round 19, 1988 for a double header at Football Park. 38,213 fans saw Sturt play Port Adelaide in the early game while reigning premiers North Adelaide faced ladder leaders Central District in the late game. The record suburban ground attendance was an estimated 24,000 who saw Sturt and Norwood at Unley Oval on 9 June 1924. A verified attendance of 22,738 saw Port play Norwood at Alberton in Round 11, 1977*.

* South Adelaide played Port Adelaide in front of 30,618 at the Adelaide Oval in Round 2, 1965. At the time the Adelaide Oval doubled as both league headquarters and South Adelaide's home ground. South Adelaide would move to Hickinbotham Oval in 1995. The Unley Oval record is for current SANFL team home grounds, though the figure was only an estimated amount. Unley Oval's confirmed record attendance of 22,015 was set in Round 9, 1968 for Sturt vs Port Adelaide.

The following are attendance figures since 1991.

Awards

Overview of History of Premiers, Runners-up and Wooden Spooners 1877–2022 
See also List of SANFL Premiers and List of SANFL wooden spoons

Club 
The Grand Final winners each season are presented the Thomas Seymour Hill Premiership Trophy, named after administrator Thomas Seymour Hill.

The Stanley H. Lewis Memorial Trophy, awarded annually since 1962, recognises the best combined record in all levels of SANFL competition. The trophy is awarded to the best performed club across five grades of the competition – Men's League, Women's League, Reserves, Under 18 and Under 16, with 100 points allocated for a men's league win, 100 points for a women's league win, 50 points for a reserves win, 50 points for an Under 18 win, and 25 points for an Under 16 win. In the event of a draw, half of the points allocated for a win in that grade are awarded to each club involved. Prior to the creation of the women's league, the trophy was awarded on the basis of performances in the men's league, reserves league and under-18 league.

Individual 

The Magarey Medal is awarded to the fairest and most brilliant player in the SANFL each season and is the oldest individual football award in Australia.

The medal was originated by and is named after William Ashley Magarey who, in 1897, was the inaugural chairman of the South Australian Football Association (as the SANFL was then known). In 1898, in an effort to stamp out rough play and improve respect of umpires, Magarey instituted the medal to be awarded to the player deemed by umpires to be the fairest and most brilliant for that season. The inaugural winner of the medal was Norwood's Alby Green. Magarey presented every medal until he died in 1929, with West Adelaide's Robert Snell the last to receive the medal during Magarey's life. The Magarey Medal is still awarded to the fairest and most brilliant SANFL player each season. The Reserves Magarey Medal recognises the standout performers in the seconds or Reserves. It is not unusual for the Reserves Magarey winner to play only half a season in the 'seconds' and the rest of the season in their club's league team.

The Ken Farmer Medal, much like the Coleman Medal in the AFL, is awarded to the league player with the most goals in a season. Named after North Adelaide and South Australia's most prolific goal-kicker Ken Farmer who ended his SANFL career with a still record 1,417 goals, the medal was introduced in 1981 after Farmer's death, with Port Adelaide's Tim Evans winning the inaugural award. Evans kicked 1,019 goals in premiership matches for the Magpies between 1975 and 1986, and is the only player other than Farmer who has kicked over 1,000 goals in the SANFL.

There are also the McCallum and Tomkins Medals, which up until the 2008 season were awarded to the best and fairest players of the U-17 and U-19 divisions respectively. These awards were merged in 2009 when the two under-age competitions were replaced with an U-18's league, similar to those adopted in the West Australian Football League and the VFL's TAC Cup. The first winner of the newly created McCallum-Tomkins Medal was South Adelaide's Luke Bowd.

The Jack Oatey Medal is awarded to the player voted best on ground in the SANFL Grand Final, first awarded in the 1981 premiership decider to Russell Ebert of Port Adelaide. In the same year, the Fos Williams Medal was also commissioned to recognise the standout performer for South Australia in interstate football, the first of which was awarded to Peter Carey of Glenelg.

Despite State of Origin football disappearing from the AFL calendar in 1999, the medal continues to be awarded to the best player for the SANFL representative team in interstate football.

The R.O. Shearman Medal, since its inception in 2000, is awarded to the player voted by the League's senior coaches on a 5–4–3–2–1 basis each game of the home-and-away season.

The Bob Quinn Medal is awarded to the player voted best afield in the Anzac Day matches between the Grand Finalists of the previous year. Commissioned in 2002, the medal was first won by James Gowans of Central District.

Also in 2002, the SANFL created the South Australian Football Hall of Fame to recognise the players, coaches, umpires, administrators and journalists who had made a significant contribution in the SANFL. The inaugural class of 2002 saw 113 inductees into the Hall of Fame and included such greats as Russell Ebert, Ken Farmer, Barrie Robran, Malcolm Blight, Fos Williams, Brian Faehse, Lindsay Head, Neil Kerley, Rick Davies and Jack Oatey.

SANFL Women's

In February 2017, the SANFL followed the example of VFL Women's (Victoria) and created a state-based women's Australian rules football competition replicating its men's league. The SANFLW expanded over the following two years and is now played by eight of the SANFL clubs (Adelaide and Port Adelaide do not feature) from February to May each year. Due to the timing of the league, most SANFLW are not contracted to clubs in the semi-professional AFL Women's national competition. Glenelg are the current league premiers.

Other SANFL competitions

Aside from the senior SANFL competition, the league has operated a reserves competition since 1919 and has operated several underage competitions. Under 19 and Under 17 competitions were run from 1937 and 1939 respectively until 2008, when the league elected to merge these competitions to form the Under 18 competition (initially known as the Maccas Cup) from 2009, and it also introduced an under 16 competition the following year. Neither Adelaide nor Port Adelaide field teams in these competitions, as Adelaide has elected not to field teams, while Port Adelaide shut down their underage teams in 2014 and their reserves team in 2018.

For a full list of reserves and under 16–19 premiers, see List of SANFL premiers#Minor grades.

See also 
 List of SANFL clubs
 List of SANFL players
 List of SANFL premiers
 List of SANFL records
 List of Magarey Medallists
 South Australian Football Hall of Fame
 SANFL Grand Finals
 List of SANFL wooden spoons

Notes

References

External links
 
 
 

 
Australian rules football governing bodies
Australian rules football competitions in South Australia
1877 establishments in Australia
Sports leagues established in 1877
Professional sports leagues in Australia